A list of mountain ranges of La Paz County, Arizona, the majority in the southern section of the Lower Colorado River Valley.

Alphabetical list
Buckskin Mountains (Arizona)–La Paz County
Chocolate Mountains (Arizona)–La Paz County
Dome Rock Mountains–La Paz County
Granite Wash Mountains–La Paz County
Harcuvar Mountains–NE. La Paz County -- (SW. Yavapai County)
Harquahala Mountains–E. La Paz County -- (W. Maricopa County)
(Kofa Mountains–N. Yuma County - (S. La Paz County) )
Little Buckskin Mountains–La Paz County
Little Harquahala Mountains–La Paz County
Little Horn Mountains–La Paz County
Middle Mountains–S. La Paz County -- (N. Yuma County)
New Water Mountains–La Paz County
Plomosa Mountains–La Paz County
Trigo Mountains–La Paz County

See also
List of mountain ranges of the Sonoran Desert
List of mountain ranges of the Lower Colorado River Valley

La Paz County, Arizona